John Forrest (1847–1918) was an Australian explorer and politician who served as the first Premier of Western Australia. 

John Forrest may also refer to:

People
Jack Forrest (footballer, born 1878) (1878–?), Scottish footballer
John Forrest (Victorian politician) (born 1949), Australian politician
Jack Forrest (rugby league) (John Alexander Forrest) (1924–2016), New Zealand international
John F. Forrest (1927–1997), U.S. Army general
John Forrest (Canadian clergyman) (1842–1920), Presbyterian clergyman and educator
John Forrest (physician) (1804–1865), British Military medical officer
John Forrest (footballer) (born 1947), English footballer
John Forrest (martyr) (1471–1538), friar and martyr
John Forrest (producer), British radio and television producer
John Forrest (rugby union) (1917–1942), Scottish rugby union international
John Samuel Forrest (1907–1992), Scottish physicist, author and professor
Sir John Forrest, 2nd Baronet, of the Forrest baronets of Scotland

See also
John Forrest National Park, Western Australia
John Forrest Secondary College, Morley, Western Australia
Jack Forrest (disambiguation)
John Forest (disambiguation)
John Forrest Dillon (1831–1914), American jurist
John Forrest Kelly (1859–1922), Irish-born American electrical engineer